Aughnacloy may refer to :

Aughnacloy, County Armagh, a townland in County Armagh, Northern Ireland
Aughnacloy, County Down, a townland near Banbridge, County Down, Northern Ireland
Aughnacloy, County Tyrone, a village in County Tyrone, Northern Ireland